Antonis Dentakis (born 13 March 1995) is a Greek professional footballer who plays as a right-back for Super League club Levadiakos.

Honours
Volos
Gamma Ethniki: 2017–18
Football League: 2018–19

References

1995 births
Living people
Footballers from Chania
Greek footballers
Super League Greece players
Football League (Greece) players
Gamma Ethniki players
Platanias F.C. players
PGS Kissamikos players
Apollon Smyrnis F.C. players
Volos N.F.C. players
Levadiakos F.C. players
Association football defenders